Dadenjan Rural District is a rural district (dehestan) in Meymand District, Firuzabad County, Fars Province, Iran. At the 2006 census, its population was 2,234, in 490 families.  The rural district has 17 villages.

References 

Rural Districts of Fars Province
Firuzabad County